René Ngongo (born October 1961 in Goma, Republic of the Congo) is a Congolese biologist, environmentalist and political activist.  Ngongo graduated from the University of Kisangani with a bachelor's degree in Biology in 1987. In 1994, he created the NGO OCEAN (Organisation Concertée des Ecologistes et Amis de la Nature) in order to protect the DRC's natural resources.

In 2009, René Ngongo received the Right Livelihood Award "for his courage in confronting the forces that are destroying the Congo’s rainforests and building political support for their conservation and sustainable use”.

See also
Wildlife of the Democratic Republic of the Congo

References

External links 

 René Ngongo's biography via Right Livelihood

1961 births
Living people
People from Goma
Democratic Republic of the Congo environmentalists
Democratic Republic of the Congo activists